Jussi Elo (6 January 1898 – 15 June 1957) was a Finnish diver. He competed in the men's plain high diving event at the 1924 Summer Olympics.

References

External links
 

1898 births
1957 deaths
Finnish male divers
Olympic divers of Finland
Divers at the 1924 Summer Olympics
People from Hämeenlinna
Sportspeople from Kanta-Häme